Shannon Beveridge (born March 19, 1992) is an American YouTuber, actress, photographer and LGBT advocate. Born in Texas, she started her YouTube channel, nowthisisliving, in 2012 and now has over 600,000 subscribers. In 2017, she won the best LGBTQ+ YouTube Channel at the 9th Shorty Awards and the LGBT+ Celebrity Rising Star Award at the 2017 British LGBT Awards.

Personal life 
Shannon Beveridge was born in Carrollton, Texas and lived in Norman, Oklahoma before moving to her current home in Los Angeles. She attended the University of Oklahoma and was in a sorority. She dated fellow YouTuber Cammie Scott from November 2012 to May 2016. From 2017 to 2020, she dated singer-songwriter Cari Fletcher. She began a relationship with Becky Missal in 2021.

Career 
Many of the videos posed on her YouTube channel are about LGBTQ+ topics. During their relationship, Cammie was often featured in her videos. On July 1, 2016, they posted a video channel explaining their breakup, which has received over 3.4 million views. Beveridge went on the "Love Is Love" tour with Miles McKenna and Rebecca Black in 2017. In 2017, Beveridge starred in the music video for Fletcher's single "Wasted Youth." Fletcher's 2020 EP The S(ex) Tapes tells the aftermath of their breakup. She filmed and directed music videos for Fletcher's EP The S(ex) Tapes, including "Sex (With My Ex), which she also starred in. In July 2022, Fletcher released the single "Becky's So Hot" about Beveridge's new girlfriend, Becky Missal. Beveridge worked with her close friend, singer-songwriter Zolita, for a music video trilogy in 2021 and 2022. She played Zolita's high school cheerleading coach in "Somebody I F*cked Once," and was the creative director for "Single in September" and  "I F*cking Love You."

Awards

Videography 
*List does not include personal and/or collaborative YouTube videos.

Directing and filming

Music videos

Acting

Notes

References

External links 
 Shannon Beveridge at IMDb

Living people
21st-century American actresses
American LGBT rights activists
LGBT YouTubers
American lesbian actresses
Actresses from Texas
YouTubers from Texas
American YouTubers
1992 births
Shorty Award winners
LGBT people from Texas
20th-century American LGBT people
21st-century American LGBT people